Newminster may refer to

Newminster (horse), the 1851 St. Leger winning racehorse
New Minster, Winchester
Newminster Abbey, Northumberland, United Kingdom
 a British tanker in service 1952-54
Robert of Newminster, Roman Catholic Saint